A list of horror films released in 2012.

References

Lists of horror films by year
2012-related lists